Cvijan is a Slavic surname and given name. It is most prevalent in Serbia.

Notable people
Notable people with this name include:

Surname
 Vladimir Cvijan (1976–2018), Serbian politician

Given name
 Cvijan Milošević (born 1963), Yugoslavian footballer
 Cvijan Šarić (fl. 1652–1668), Serbian soldier

See also
 Cvijanović

References

Serbian masculine given names
Serbian surnames